Ulwa language may refer to:

Yaul language of Papua New Guinea
Ulwa language (Sumo) of Nicaragua